Nádudvar is a town in Hajdú-Bihar county, in the Northern Great Plain region of eastern Hungary.

Geography

Twin towns – sister cities

Nádudvar is twinned with:
 Urzędów, Poland (2000)  
 Sălard, Romania (2007)

References

External links

 in Hungarian, English and German

 
Populated places in Hajdú-Bihar County